The County Executive of Cuyahoga County, the second largest county in Ohio, and the 29th largest county by population in the United States, is the elected chief executive of the Cuyahoga County government. Democrat Chris Ronanye is the current county executive. The county charter stipulates that the executive is responsible for the appointment and removal of county personnel, working with other local governments, introducing legislation to the county council, submitting budgets and capital improvements plans to the council, and many other duties.

Formation 
After a widespread corruption scandal was revealed, the voters of Cuyahoga County, which includes the City of Cleveland and 58 surrounding suburbs, voted to authorize a new form of county government on November 3, 2009. 
The charter replaced three county commissioners with an executive and 11-member council. Under the charter, other previously elected posts, such as sheriff, treasurer, and clerk of courts became appointed positions under the executive. Summit County is the only other Ohio county with an executive.

Democrat Ed FitzGerald, the then-Mayor of Lakewood, Ohio, defeated Matt Dolan in the initial election in November 2010 and was sworn in as the first Cuyahoga County executive on January 1, 2011 and inaugurated on January 9.

Political implications 
After FitzGerald was elected, The Plain Dealer political reporter Henry J. Gomez wrote that many observers believed the county executive job would "be second only to the governor in terms of power and constituency." This prediction seemed to foreshadow FitzGerald's decision to challenge John Kasich's re-election bid for Governor of Ohio in 2014. FitzGerald was the Democratic nominee for the November election.  However, he was defeated.

Elections
After FitzGerald chose to run for Governor of Ohio in 2014, then-state Representative Armond Budish was elected to succeed him. Budish was reelected in 2018, but chose not to run again in 2022. Democrat Chris Ronayne defeated Republican Lee Weingart in the November 2022 election to become the third person to hold the office.

County Executives

References

External links

Government of Cuyahoga County, Ohio
County executives in Ohio